The Music Library Association (MLA) of the United States is the main professional organization for music libraries and librarians (including those whose music materials form only part of their responsibilities and collections).  It also serves corporations, institutions, students, composers, scholars and others whose work and interests lie in the music librarianship field.  National meetings occur annually.

Purpose
"The purposes of the Association shall be to promote the establishment, growth, and use of music libraries; to encourage the collection of music and musical literature in libraries; to further studies in musical bibliography; to increase efficiency in music library service and administration; and to promote the profession of music librarianship.  The Association is a non-stock, non-profit corporation organized and operated exclusively for said purposes.  No part of the net earnings of the Association shall inure to the benefit of any individual.  No officer, member, or delegate of a member shall, as such, receive compensation except that reasonable compensation may be paid for services of employees of the Association."

Organization
The MLA is composed of five operational elements:
 Administration: officers of the MLA, including the board of directors, special officers, editors, and business office.
 Committees: groups formed to address specific issues in the (standing) categories of development, education, finance, membership, program and publications.  Special committees are appointed by the president for administration, awards, bibliographic control, legislation, preservation, public libraries, reference and public service, and resource sharing and collection development.  There are also joint committees involved with other institutions, such music organizations and academic institutions.
 Representatives and Liaisons: to external organizations involved in library and information science and/or music.
 Roundtables and Interest Groups: composed of MLA members, assembling during annual meetings.  Roundtables allow members to discuss specific issues not covered by committees.
 Regional Chapters: As stated on the MLA website, these chapters have two functions: "To promote cooperation among music librarians and among libraries within a given region" and "To provide a forum for discussion of library matters, some of which may be more specific or more regional in nature than those on programs at national meetings."  Like the MLA, regional chapters have listservs that they use to distribute information to members.

Regional chapters include:

 Atlantic 
 California
 Greater New York 
 Midwest 
 Mountain-Plains
 New England
 New York State- Ontario
 Pacific Northwest 
 Southeast 
 Texas

Membership

The MLA offers membership on a yearly basis.  Costs vary depending on the type of membership (institutional, associate, student, retired, etc.).

Publications

The MLA produces several different publications covering different aspects of the field.  Publications include:

 a quarterly newsletter
 a membership handbook
 Notes, Quarterly Journal of the Music Library Association
 Three series:
 Basic Manual Series- "designed to assist the librarian in dealing with various aspects of the organization, administration and use of a music library."
 Index and Bibliography Series- presenting resources for music and music literature, from discographies of popular music to bibliographies of subjects in ethnomusicology. 
Technical Reports- viewing the hands-on aspects of the field, such as cataloging issues, audio equipment, and current research topics.

Services

The MLA website offers a wide range of services and resources to members and non-members alike: employment and education information, awards and grants, copyright guidelines, and resources concerning the field.  These include the MLA-L (a listserv open to the public), resources generated by the MLA committees and groups, external resources via print and web, and the MLA Shop, which is the organization's official store.

History 
The Music Library Association was founded in June 1931 during the American Library Association meetings in New Haven, Connecticut.  Its founding was spearheaded by Eva Judd O'Meara (1884–1979) and Carleton Sprague Smith (1905–1994) of the New York Public Library.  Among their objectives was to improve cataloging for sheet music and audio recordings.

Presidents 
 2019 — Susannah Cleveland, Bowling Green State University / University of North Texas
2017 — Mark McKnight, University of North Texas
 2015 — Michael Rogan, Tufts University
 2013 — Michael D. Colby, UC Davis
 2011 — Jerry L. McBride, Stanford University
 2009 — Ruthann Boles McTyre (born 1954), University of Iowa
 2007 — Philip R. Vandermeer, PhD, UNC Chapel Hill
 2005 — Bonna Jean Boettcher, DMA (born 1958), Bowling Green State University / Cornell University
 2003 — Laura Anne Dankner (born 1945), Loyola University New Orleans
 2001 — James P. Cassaro (born 1954), University of Pittsburgh
 1999 — Paula D. Matthews, Princeton
 1997 — Diane Parr Walker (born 1953), University of Virginia
 1995 — Jane Ellen Gottlieb (born 1954), Juilliard
 1993 — Michael Ochs (born 1937), Harvard
 1991 — Don L. Roberts (born 1938), Northwestern
 1989 — Susan T. Sommer (1935–2008), New York Public Library
 1987 — Lenore F. Coral (1939–2005), Cornell
 1985 — Geraldine Esther Ostrove (born 1938), New England Conservatory
 1983 — Mary Wallace Davidson ( –1912), Eastman
 1981 — Donald William Krummel, PhD (born 1929), University of Illinois at Urbana–Champaign
 1979 — Ruth Taiko Watanabe (1916–2005), Eastman
 1977 — Dena Julia Epstein (née Polacheck; born 1916), University of Chicago
 1975 — Clara Steuermann (1922–1982)
 1973 — James Worrell Pruett (born 1932), UNC Chapel Hill
 1971 — William M. McClellan
 1969 — Walter Gerboth
 1967 — Frank C. Campbell
 1966 — Hugh Wiley Hitchcock (1923–2007), Brooklyn College
 1965 — Irving Lowens
 1964 — William B. Weichlein
 1963 — Philip Lieson Miller (1906–1996), New York Public Library
 1962 — Rita Benton, PhD (née Rita Beatrice Rosenfeld; 1918–1980), University of Iowa
 1961 — Vincent Harris Duckles (1913–1985), UC Berkeley
 1960 — James Burrell Coover (1925–2004), Vassar
 1958 — Brooks Shepard, Jr. (1922–1990), Yale
 1956 — Virginia Cunningham, (née Virginia Adelaide Meeks; 1910–1996), Library of Congress
 1954 — Charles Warren Fox (1904–1983), Eastman
 1951 — Harold Spivacke (1904–1977), Library of Congress
 1950 — Edward Eugene Colby (1912–2006), Stanford
 1948 — Wilburn Scott Goldthwaite (1901–1981), University of Chicago
 1946 — H. Dorothy Tilly (1892–1976)
 1941 — Edward Neighbor Waters (1906–1991), Library of Congress
 1939 — George Sherman Dickinson (1886–1964)
 1937 — Carleton Sprague Smith (1905–1994), New York Public Library
 1935 — William Oliver Strunk
 1931 — Otto Kinkeldey

External links
 Music Library Association
 Music Library Association Archives - Special Collections in Performing Arts at the University of Maryland
Malena Kuss files on Carleton Sprague Smith, 1981-2007 Music Division, The New York Public Library.

Notes

Music libraries
Library-related professional associations
Music organizations based in the United States
Organizations established in 1931
1931 establishments in the United States